The Sundsfjord Hydroelectric Power Station ( or Sundsfjord kraftstasjon) is a hydroelectric power station in the municipality of Gildeskål in Nordland county, Norway. Part of the plant's catchment area also lies in the municipality of Beiarn.

The Forså Hydroelectric Power Station supplies water to Sokumvatnet and the Langvann Hydroelectric Power Station supplies water to Langvatnet.

The plant was originally built by Norsk Hydro and Gildeskål Kraftlag to supply industry at Glomfjord and is now owned by Salten Kraftsamband. It came into operation in 1963.

See also

References

Hydroelectric power stations in Norway
Gildeskål
Beiarn
Energy infrastructure completed in 1963
1963 establishments in Norway